The 2020 Virginia Democratic presidential primary took place on March 3, 2020, as one of 15 contests scheduled on Super Tuesday in the Democratic Party primaries for the 2020 presidential election, following the South Carolina primary the weekend before. The Virginia primary was an open primary, wherein any registered voter can vote, regardless of party registration. The state awarded 124 delegates towards the 2020 Democratic National Convention, of which 99 were pledged delegates allocated at the local level.

Former vice president Joe Biden won the state by a landslide, receiving more than 53% of the vote and 67 delegates, far ahead senator Bernie Sanders, who reached around 23% and 31 delegates, and senator Elizabeth Warren, who failed to poll over 15% and got a single district delegate. Biden's win by over 30 points was much stronger than expected in pre-election polls, and he also won nearly every county across nearly all demographics. His strongest performances were among African-American voters, suburban voters and he also handily won nearly all rural counties dominated by white, working-class voters.

Procedure
Virginia was one of 14 states and one territory holding primaries on March 3, 2020, also known as "Super Tuesday". Absentee voting began 45 days earlier, on January 18, 2020, for voters able to give an acceptable reason for being unable to vote on March 3. Voting took place throughout the state from 6:00 a.m. until 7:00 p.m. In the open primary, candidates had to meet a threshold of 15 percent at the congressional district or statewide level in order to be considered viable. The 99 pledged delegates to the 2020 Democratic National Convention were allocated proportionally on the basis of the results of the primary. Of these, between 4 and 7 were allocated to each of the state's 11 congressional districts and another 13 were allocated to party leaders and elected officials (PLEO delegates), in addition to 21 at-large delegates. The Super Tuesday primary as part of Stage I on the primary timetable received no bonus delegates, in order to disperse the primaries between more different date clusters and keep too many states from hoarding on the first shared date or on a March date in general.

After county and city caucuses between April 18, and April 20, 2020, during which district delegates were elected for the district conventions and the state convention, the district conventions between May 2, and May 16, 2020 elected national convention district level delegates. The state convention then convened on June 20, 2020 in Richmond to vote on the 21 at-large and 13 pledged PLEO delegates for the Democratic National Convention. The delegation also included 25 unpledged PLEO delegates: 14 members of the Democratic National Committee, 9 members of Congress (both senators, one of them was former DNC chair Tim Kaine, and 7 representatives), the governor Ralph Northam, and former DNC chair Terry McAuliffe.

Candidates
Ballot access to the primary was not automatic, and potential candidates had to file a 5,000-signature petition from qualified voters, with at least 200 signatures from each of the state's 11 congressional districts by December 12, 2019, to appear on the primary ballot.

The following candidates were on the ballot:

Running

Joe Biden
Michael Bloomberg
Tulsi Gabbard
Bernie Sanders
Elizabeth Warren

Withdrawn

Michael Bennet
Cory Booker
Pete Buttigieg
Julian Castro
Amy Klobuchar
Deval Patrick
Tom Steyer
Marianne Williamson
Andrew Yang

Polling

Results

Results by locality

Notes 

Additional candidates

References

External links
The Green Papers delegate allocation summary
Virginia Democratic Party draft delegate selection plan
FiveThirtyEight Virginia primary poll tracker

Virginia Democratic
Democratic primary
2020